Ana Ivanovic was the defending champion, but lost in the second round to Yan Zi.

Justine Henin won in the final 7–6(7–3), 7–5 against Jelena Janković.

Seeds
The top eight seeds receive a bye into the second round. 

  Justine Henin (champion)
  Jelena Janković (final)
  Svetlana Kuznetsova (quarterfinals)
  Ana Ivanovic  (second round)
  Anna Chakvetadze (second round, retired due to a viral illness)
  Nadia Petrova (quarterfinals)
  Marion Bartoli (quarterfinals, retired due to a viral illness)
  Elena Dementieva (second round)
  Dinara Safina (third round)
  Patty Schnyder (third round)
  Shahar Pe'er (third round)
  Tatiana Golovin (semifinals)
  Sybille Bammer (third round)
  Katarina Srebotnik (second round, retired due to a viral illness)
  Alona Bondarenko (first round)
  Lucie Šafářová (second round)

Draw

Finals

Top half

Section 1

Section 2

Bottom half

Section 3

Section 4

External links
Draw and Qualifying Draw

Cup - Singles